Max Friedman (died 1964) was an American songwriter and published music through his company, Max Friedman Music Publishing Co.

Career
He composed songs about World War I including "Like a Baby Needs its Mother That's How Uncle Sam Needs You" (1917); "Our Own American Boy (1917); Before I Grew Up to Love You (1918); and the post-war "Give the Job to the Gob and the Doughboy" (1919), a plea for employers to hire veterans, featuring lyrics by Lew Porter and Alex Sullivan.

He founded with P. and H. R. Shapiro the Max Friedman Music Publishing Co., which operated out of Buffalo, New York.

He also composed the 1928 Gene Austin hit "I Wish I Had Died In My Cradle (Before I Grew Up To Love You)", for which Lew Brown wrote the lyrics.

Selected works
Friedman, Max. Before I Grew Up to Love You. New York: Shapiro, Bernstein & Co, 1918. 
Friedman, Max, Lew Porter, and Alex Sullivan. Give a Job to the Gob and the Doughboy: Song.  Detroit: Jerome H. Remick & Co., 1919. 
Friedman, M. I Wish I Had Died in My Cradle: Before I Grew Up to Love You. New York: Shapiro, Bernstein & Co. Inc, 1926.  and 
Friedman, Max. In the Heart of Kentucky: (Where You Gave Your Heart to Me). Pittsburgh, PA: Max Friedman Music Publishing Co., 1918. 
Friedman, Max, George F. Olcott, and Joseph Hiller. Like a Baby Needs Its Mother: That's How Uncle Sam Needs You. New York: M. Friedman Music Pub. Co, 1917. 
Friedman, Max. Lonesomeness. New York: Shapiro, Bernstein & Co, 1919. 
Friedman, Max, Frank Davis, and Louis Johnson. My Sweet Erin Rose. Pittsburgh: Max Friedman Music Publishing Co., 1916.  
Friedman, Max, Geo Olcott, and W. C. Wilbert. Our Own American Boy. Pittsburgh: Max Friedman Music Co., 1917. 
Friedman, Max, Walter C. Ness, Murray Sturm, and Kenn Sisson. Spread a little sunshine: where the sun never shines. New York: Max Friedman Music Publishing Co, Inc, 1924.

References

1964 deaths
American male songwriters
Music publishers (people)